Peter Lamont is a former footballer. He played for Alloa Athletic for whom he was the leading goalscorer in 1989–1990. In 2005, he came third in a fans' poll run by Football Focus to find Alloa's all-time cult hero. He also played for Clydebank, Cowdenbeath and East Stirlingshire in the Scottish Football League. After retiring, he coached for a time at Wolves Boys Club (Glasgow).

References 

Living people
Scottish footballers
Scottish Football League players
Alloa Athletic F.C. players
Clydebank F.C. (1965) players
Cowdenbeath F.C. players
East Stirlingshire F.C. players
Association footballers not categorized by position
Year of birth missing (living people)